Rutki-Bronisze  is a village in the administrative district of Gmina Ciechanów, within Ciechanów County, Masovian Voivodeship, in east-central Poland.

References

Rutki-Bronisze